Dvory is a municipality and village in Nymburk District in the Central Bohemian Region of the Czech Republic. It has about 600 inhabitants.

Administrative parts
The village of Veleliby is an administrative part of Dvory.

References

Villages in Nymburk District